HNoMS Horten (A530) was a Norwegian support vessel built at Karljohansvern in Horten, the city from which the ship was named, in 1977. She was in service with the Royal Norwegian Navy until her retirement in 2008 and filled a number of roles while in service.

After being sold in 2012, the Horten is currently (2014) employed as a fishery patrol vessel in Nigeria, supporting the fleet of fast patrol boats sold along with her.

History

Horten was originally designed as a support craft for submarines and fast attack craft. After a change in the design which shortened the vessel and gave her smaller torpedo stores than originally intended, this role was reduced. Rather than supplying smaller ships with ordnance, Horten functioned primarily as support craft with regards to food, fuel and water – in some cases, the on-board facilities were also made available to crews visiting from smaller ships. Horten was known as a spacious vessel – privates had four-man cabins, leading privates had two-man cabins and some petty officers had single cabins. Commissioned officers had cabins of a high standard and the captain a large, separate cabin with top facilities. There were also guest quarters for high-ranking officers on the same deck as the captain's quarters. The officers also had a separate mess hall with a bar. During naval exercises (e.g. Joint Winter and Blue Game) in the early 2000s (decade), the ship functioned as command vessel for NATO officers responsible for overseeing the exercise.

In 1985, the ship served as royal yacht for king Olav V whilst the royal yacht HNoMY Norge was repaired after a fire in the winter that year. Part of the reason for this choice was the ship's excellent facilities (see above).

In the 1986–89 period, Horten was laid up. When returning to service in 1989, she was turned into a school ship in the School squadron along with HNoMS Hessa and HNoMS Vigra. The facilities on board and the size of the vessel ensured that academy cadets could get experience with navigation and command in addition to normal schooling. The ship continued to function in this role intermittently throughout the 1990s and into the early 2000s (decade), as well as serving as support vessel.

During 2005–08, Horten primarily functioned as living and training centre for the crews of the new Nansen class frigates. She had previously served as training ship for frigate crews in 2001, after the Trondheim was being repaired after a boiler failure.

Horten was decommissioned in 2008, after many years of discussion and postponement due to the lack of a suitable replacement. The sale of the ship turned out to be a lengthy and difficult process, as the Ministry of Defence wanted to sell her along with retired (albeit still armed) fast patrol boats.

After several failed attempts to complete a sale, it was eventually reported in 2012 that the ship had been sold to an undisclosed buyer in England. It was later revealed, causing some scandal in Norwegian media, that the ship had been sold to a Nigerian warlord, via a British shell company.

Pictures

Bibliography
 Stephen Saunders RN red. (2004). Jane's Fighting Ships 2004-2005, 107. ed., s. 518. Jane’s Information Group Limited. .
 Marius Thomassen (1995). 90 år under rent norsk orlogsflagg. .

References

External links
 The Norwegian defence: The Navy
 The Norwegian Defence: Naval craft

Ships built in Horten
Auxiliary ships of the Royal Norwegian Navy
1977 ships
Royal and presidential yachts